Anna Karen Morrow (September 20, 1914 – July 1, 2009) was an American model turned film and television actress.

Biography
Morrow appeared in such films as The Price of Fear, The Wrong Man and It Happened in Athens, and in such television series as Star Trek episode "All Our Yesterdays", Gunsmoke, Jefferson Drum, Wagon Train, The Farmer's Daughter, Hazel, and The Perry Como Show and in the Broadway play Red Gloves. On the ABC prime-time soap opera Peyton Place, she appeared in nineteen episodes from 1965 to 1966 as Mrs. Chernak, the Harrington family housekeeper.

In 1947, she married actor Jeff Morrow, co-star of the syndicated Western television series Union Pacific, which aired from 1958 to 1959. 

Morrow died in 2009 at the age of 94 in Woodland Hills, California.

References

External links

Anna Karen Morrow obituary, Daily Telegraph obituary

1914 births
2009 deaths
20th-century American actresses
Female models from New Jersey
American film actresses
American television actresses
Actresses from New Jersey
People from Woodland Hills, Los Angeles
Place of birth missing
21st-century American women